Martin Tabert (1899 – February 2, 1922) was an early 20th Century American forced laborer. The circumstances of Tabert’s death – being a white man beaten to death by an overseer – caused a public reaction that resulted eventually in the end of Florida’s longstanding convict leasing system. Convict leasing was one of the forms of legalized involuntary servitude common in the American south from the 1880s through the 1940s. 

Tabert was a 22-year-old man from Munich, North Dakota who was arrested in December 1921 as part of a police mass-arrest sweep, on a charge of 'vagrancy', for being on a train without a ticket in Tallahassee, Florida. Tabert was convicted and fined $25 (equivalent to about one week's wages). Although his parents sent $50 to pay the fine, plus $25 more so Tabert could afford transportation back home to North Dakota, their money disappeared in the Leon County prison system, where Sheriff James Robert Jones earned $20 for each prisoner he leased out as cheap labor to local businesses.

In January 1922 Tabert was whipped with a leather strap by supervisor (aka "whipping boss") Thomas Walter Higginbotham. It was alleged that Tabert was whipped approximately 150 times: 30-50 times initially, knocking him to the ground; at least another 30 times more, when he was ordered to get up but didn't (or couldn't); and further as the overseer chased Tabert through the work camp. Tabert ultimately made it back to his bed, where he died of his injuries just hours later. Coverage of Tabert's killing by the newspaper New York World earned it the Pulitzer Prize for Public Service. Florida governor Cary A. Hardee ended Florida's system of convict leasing in 1923, in part due to public revulsion resulting from the widespread publicity concerning the conviction of Higginbotham for second-degree murder and concern about the effect of the publicity on the state's tourist trade.

Marjory Stoneman Douglas wrote a poem about the killing.

References 

1922 deaths
1899 births
Prison reform
People from Cavalier County, North Dakota
Prisoners who died in Florida detention
Deaths by beating in the United States
Whipping